= Najwa Tlili =

Tunisian film director and screenwriter

- Born: Tunisia
- Occupation: Film director

Najwa Tlili is a Tunisian film director living in Montreal, Canada.

== Biography ==
Tlili was born in southwestern Tunisia. She studied at the Sorbonne in Paris. She moved to Montreal in 1991.

Her first film, Heritage (1994), is about a woman, Selma, who returns to her home in Tunisia but feels disconnected from her cultural background. Tlili describes it as "a voyage deep in my memory, a memory of the footprints that I left in Tunisia. I travelled in these tracks." Rupture (1997) is a documentary about domestic violence focusing on two Tunisian women in Canada.

Tlili compiled a directory of women filmmakers, Répertoire des femmes d’images de l'Afrique francophone (1994).

== Filmography ==
- al-Shigara/Héritage ("Heritage"), fiction, 35 mm, 26 min, 1994.
- Infisal/Rupture, documentary, video, 52 min, 1997.

== Bibliography ==
- Répertoire des femmes d’images de l'Afrique francophone. Montréal: Vues d’ Afrique, 1994.
